Supremacy, released in 1994, is the second album by Dutch power metal band Elegy.

Track listing 
"Windows of the World" - 5:10
"Angel´s Grace" - 7:09
"Poisoned Hearts" - 5:26
"Lust for Life" - 5:21
"Anouk" (instrumental) - 1:53
"Circles in the Sand" - 4:42
"Darkest Night" - 4:10 
"Close Your Eyes" - 0:39
"Supremacy" - 5:01
"Erase Me" - 7:27

Bonus Tracks (2009 re-release) 
"All Systems Go" (instrumental, demo)
"The Grand Change" (demo)

Contributing Artists

Band Members
Eduard Hovinga - vocals, guitars (track 4)
Martin Helmantel - bass 
Henk van de Laars - guitars,  keyboards
Gilbert Pot - guitars, keyboards
Dirk Bruinenberg - drums, keyboards

Guest Artists
Stefan Schneider-Reuter - keyboards
Andreas Hirschmann - keyboards

External links
 Encyclopaedia Metallum entry

1994 albums
Elegy (band) albums
Noise Records albums